The Bozsik József Stadion was a multi-use UEFA category 4 stadium in Budapest, Hungary. The old stadium was demolished completely in 2019. It was used for football matches and was the home stadium of Budapest Honvéd FC. The stadium had a capacity of 8,760 spectators.

History

Near the present day stadium (at the site of the cemetery) the first own football ground of the club was built. Supporters gave KAC an estate for thar purpose at the end of Sárkány (Dragon) Street. A fundraiser was initiated among local craftsmen and tradesmen and it was Ferenc Polacsek (hotel owner) and Ferenc Herbacsek (wood trader) who gave major financial contributions to build the sports complex. The inauguration of the Sárkány Street complex was in 1913, hence the name Dragon's Cave - given later by the visiting teams.

On 18 November 1926, Kispest city voted to give 500 million Hungarian korona to modernize the Sárkány Street football grounds. In 1935 the wooden stands and the buildings burned down. József Molnár, the chairman, averted a crisis and built a bigger and more modern stadium. The new Kispest AC sports complex was inaugurated on 2 January 1938. The new arena is situated at the tram no. 42 terminal and it had a capacity of 8.000 (5.000 seats and 3.000 stands). A bath house was also established in the same site, but it is now closed.

On 12 February 1939 a new football stadium was inaugurated with a capacity of 15.000.

In 1945, right after the war, the people of Kispest started reconstruction works: the grass was regrown and the concrete roofs was mended. Training grounds were built in the area, reaching as far as the cemetery.

In 1955, the complex was rebuilt and extended; the team had to play all of its matches away.

On 20 May 1967, the lights were inaugurated with a friendly match against Szombathelyi Haladás. The stadium had a capacity of 25.000. The team could train in grass and in clay.

Kispest stadium was the first to be named after a Hungarian football player. József Bozsik received the honour, having 101 caps in the national team.

On 1 October 1986, a show preceded the Bp. Honvéd-Bröndby European Cup match inaugurating Bozsik Stadium. Before kick off, Lajos Tichy said a few words on behalf of the players, and Chairman Sándor Kiss also gave a speech. The show ended with fireworks.
The stadium was given new, stronger lights for this occasion and the grass was also replaced with a new variety. Furthermore, a heating system was installed under the pitch. The field was made longer and wider. A 20-room hotel was also built inside the stadium with a restaurant seating 200.

In 1990 the locker rooms and bathrooms were renewed. The old gym-hall was turned into a VIP club.

16 years later, they fell into disrepair when the new owner of the club, George Hemingway, decided to completely renew the stadium.
The new capacity of the stadium is 10,000 (6,000 seats, 4.000 standing places).

On 5 August 2018, the last match was played at the stadium. The match was won by Honvéd against Paksi FC on the 3rd match day of the 2018–19 Nemzeti Bajnokság I. The only goal was scored by Danilo Cirino de Oliveira in the 48th minute. The referee was Viktor Kassai.

Milestone matches

Attendances
As of 29 June 2017.

References

External links
Bozsik József Stadion at magyarfutball.hu
Bozsik József Stadion on the official club website
Stadium pictures at StadiumDB.com

Football venues in Hungary
Budapest Honvéd FC
Sports venues in Budapest
Sports venues demolished in 2019
Demolished buildings and structures in Hungary